Ajit Singh Mehta is an Indian politician from Bharatiya Janata Party (BJP). He was a Member of Legislative Assembly (MLA) from Tonk. In the Rajasthan Assembly Election of 2013, Ajit Singh Mehta was fielded against Independent candidate Saud Saidi in Tonk. He secured 49.96% of the votes polled and won the election by 30,343 votes.

Early life and political career 
Mehta was born on 9 May 1965 in Tonk, Rajasthan. His father's name is Ummed Singh. He is married to Nirmala Mehta and has a son Vishal Mehta and a daughter Nitika Mehta. Prior to being an MLA, He served as the Divisional President and District Vice President.

2013 Assembly election result

References 

1970 births
Rajasthan MLAs 2013–2018
Bharatiya Janata Party politicians from Rajasthan
Living people